"Sleep Alone" is a song by Northern Irish band Two Door Cinema Club from their second studio album, Beacon (2012). It was released on 20 July 2012 as the album's lead single. The track is included in the official soundtrack for EA Sports game, FIFA 13. It was also featured in season four of The Vampire Diaries and in series two of The Dumping Ground.

Track listings

Credits and personnel
Lead vocals – Two Door Cinema Club
Lyrics – Alex Trimble, Kevin Baird, Sam Halliday

Charts

Release history

References

2012 singles
2012 songs
Kitsuné singles
Two Door Cinema Club songs